Faltan Lunas is Fey's sixth studio album, released in July 2006. The first single to be taken from the album was "Y Aquí Estoy". Faltan Lunas was well received by the Latin public and critics, and, when released, became "Album of the Week" at Mixup, the most important music store in Mexico, for its high sales. Fey said in an interview that there were to be two additional tracks on the album or 13. Those two additional tracks were supposed to be English versions of two other songs on the album, but these were never released.

Controversy
This album sparked a lot of controversy; especially among Fey's longtime fans because the label and Fey's management team were accused of doing very little to promote their artist. This was evident when the album performed poorly. After almost 6 months of the official release of the album, there had been no international release and any single released has failed miserably in comparison with those from prior albums.

Due to the album's failure, Fey seemingly disappeared, failing to make appearances at promotional events, concerts or television shows. This led to rumors of a possible second retirement. In early April, however, she declared that she "made drastic changes" regarding management and her label.

The release of the album went unnoticed by radio stations who gave no airplay to Fey's newest songs. Y Aquí Estoy reached the top 10 thanks in part to digital sales. The second single, "Como un Ángel", failed to chart.

At least 9 of the 11 songs of the album were covers of songs performed by other artists, a fact that disappointed many of her fans.

The album is considered to have sold almost 100,000 copies (the least successful Fey's album).

Track listing
The album contents 11 songs in Spanish. This is the official track listing:

Singles

Fey (singer) albums
2006 albums